{

Taranis inkasa is a species of sea snail, a marine gastropod mollusk in the family Raphitomidae.

Description
The length of the shell attains 3.8 mm, its diameter 1.7 mm.

Distribution
This marine species is endemic to South Africa and occurs on the continental shelf off Durban and northern Natal, at a depth of about 85–110 m

References

External links
 
 R. N. Kilburn, Turridae (Mollusca: Gastropoda) of southern Africa and Mozambique. Part 5. Subfamily Taraninae; Ann. Natal Mus. Vol. 32 Pages 325-339 Pietermaritzburg October. 1991

Endemic fauna of South Africa
inkasa
Gastropods described in 1991